The Shohatsu (小発) or 10m landing craft was a small landing craft used by the Imperial Japanese Army during World War II. It was used for landing personnel and stores. It was designated the "Type B" landing craft by the United States.

Design
The ship could hold 35 men, or 3.5 tons of cargo. It was built of steel, and had a single bow with no landing ramp.

Service history
It was carried by destroyers and smaller vessels as a cargo boat. Japan ordered 20 of the Shohatsu class land crafts, but it is not known how many of them were actually finished and delivered.

References

Citations

Books

Websites

Further reading
Jentschura, Hansgeorg; Jung, Dieter; and Mickel, Peter. Translated by Brown, J.D. 1977. Warships of the Imperial Japanese Navy, 1869–1945. Naval Institute Press. .
Military Monograph Series - Japanese Landing Craft of World War II. Merriam Press. 

Landing craft
Military boats
Ships of the Imperial Japanese Army
Amphibious warfare vessels of Japan